Thomas Dawson may refer to:

 Thomas Dawson (soldier) (1784–1846), American soldier and politician
 Thomas Rayner Dawson (1889–1951), chess problemist
 David Thomas Dawson (1957–2006), American murderer
 Thomas Cleland Dawson (1865–1912), American diplomat
 Thomas Dawson (college president) (died 1760), president of the College of William and Mary in the 1750s
 Thomas Dawson, 1st Viscount Cremorne (1725–1813), Irish landowner and politician from County Monaghan
 Thomas Dawson (physician) (1725?–1782), English physician, authored medical texts
 Thomas Vesey Dawson (1819–1854), Member of Parliament for County Louth, 1841–1847
 Thomas Vesey Dawson (priest) (1768–1811), Anglican priest in Ireland
 Tommy Dawson (footballer, born 1901) (1901–1977), English football player
 Tommy Dawson (footballer, born 1915) (1915–1972), English football player
 Thomas Dawson, Lord Dawson (1948–2007), Scottish lawyer
 Thomas Hilton Dawson (born 1953), British politician
 Thomas Dawson (cook) (1585–1620), author of the Good Huswife's Jewell, 1585
 Thomas Dawson (speed skater) (born 1942), British Olympic speed skater